Harmodius was the name of three ships operated by the Houston Line

, purchased in 1900, sold in 1919.
, torpedoed and sunk in 1941
, purchased in 1948, sold in 1951

Ship names